List of mollusc orders illustrates the 97 orders in the phylum Mollusca, the largest marine animal phylum. 85,000 extant species are described, making up 23% of described marine organisms.

Class Aplacophora

Subclass Caudofoveata 
No orders, 6 families, 15 genera, 150 species.

Subclass Solenogastres 
 Order Neomeniamorpha
 Order Pholidoskepia

Testaria (unranked)

Class Polyplacophora (Chitons) 
 Order Multiplacophora †
 Order Neoloricata 
 Order Paleoloricata †

Subphylum Conchifera

Class Bivalvia

Subclass Heterodonta 

 Superfamily Arcticoidea
 Superfamily Cardioidea
 Superfamily Chamoidea
 Superfamily Clavagelloidea
 Superfamily Crassatelloidea
 Superfamily Cuspidarioidea
 Superfamily Hippuritoida †
 Superfamily Cyamioidea
 Superfamily Cyrenoidea
 Superfamily Cyrenoidoidea
 Superfamily Dreissenoidea
 Superfamily Galeommatoidea
 Superfamily Gastrochaenoidea
 Superfamily Glossoidea
 Superfamily Hemidonacoidea
 Superfamily Hiatelloidea
 Superfamily Limoidea
 Superfamily Lucinoidea
 Superfamily Mactroidea
 Superfamily Myoidea
 Superfamily Pandoroidea
 Superfamily Pholadoidea
 Superfamily Pholadomyoidea
 Superfamily Solenoidea
 Superfamily Sphaerioidea
 Superfamily Tellinoidea
 Superfamily Thyasiroidea
 Superfamily Ungulinoidea
 Superfamily Veneroidea
 Superfamily Verticordioidea

Subclass Palaeoheterodonta 

 Superfamily Trigonioidea
 Superfamily Unionoidea

Subclass Protobranchia 
 Superfamily Manzanelloidea
 Superfamily Nuculanoidea
 Superfamily Nuculoidea
 Superfamily Sapretoidea
 Superfamily Solemyoidea

Subclass Pteriomorphia 

 Superfamily Anomioidea
 Superfamily Arcoidea
 Superfamily Dimyoidea
 Superfamily Limoidea
 Superfamily Mytiloidea
 Superfamily Ostreoidea
 Superfamily Pectinoidea
 Superfamily Pinnoidea
 Superfamily Plicatuloidea
 Superfamily Pterioidea

Class Cephalopoda

Subclass Nautiloidea 

 Order Plectronocerida †
 Order Ellesmerocerida †
 Order Actinocerida †
 Order Pseudorthocerida †
 Order Ascocerida †
 Order Endocerida †
 Order Tarphycerida †
 Order Oncocerida †
 Order Discosorida †
 Order Nautilida
 Order Orthocerida †
 Order Lituitida †
 Order Dissidocerida †
 Order Bactritida †

Subclass Ammonoidea † 

 Order Goniatitida †
 Order Prolecanitida †
 Order Ceratitida †
 Order Ammonitida †

Subclass Coleoidea

Division Belemnitida 

 Order Belemnoidea †
 Order Aulacocerida †
 Order Phragmoteuthida †
 Order Donovaniconida †
 Order Belemnitida †
 Order Hematitida †

Division Neocoleoidea (most living cephalopods) 

Superorder Decapodiformes
 Order Boletzkyida † 
 Order Spirulida ram's horn squid
 Order Sepiida cuttlefish
 Order Sepiolida bobtail squid
 Order Teuthida squid
Superorder Octopodiformes
 Order Vampyromorphida vampire squid
 Order Octopoda octopus

Class Gastropoda 

This overview of orders follows the taxonomy of the Gastropoda (Ponder & Lindberg, 1997):

 Order Bellerophontinaka (fossil)
 Order Mimospirina (fossil)
Subclass Eogastropoda 
Order Euomphalida de Koninck 1881 (fossil)
 Order Patellogastropoda Lindberg, 1986 (true limpets)

'Subclass Orthogastropoda Ponder & David R. Lindberg, 1996  
 Order Murchisoniina Cox & Knight, 1960 (fossil)
 Order Neomphaloida Sitnikova & Starobogatov, 1983
Superorder Vetigastropoda Salvini-Plawen, 1989 (limpets)

Superorder Neritaemorphi Koken, 1896
 Order Cyrtoneritomorpha (fossil'')
 Order Neritopsina Cox & Knight, 1960
Superorder Caenogastropoda Cox, 1960
 Order Architaenioglossa Haller, 1890
 Order Sorbeoconcha Ponder & David R. Lindberg, 1997
 Infraorder Littorinimorpha Golikov & Starobogatov, 1975
 Infraorder Ptenoglossa J.E. Gray, 1853
 Infraorder Neogastropoda Thiele, 1929
Superorder Heterobranchia J.E. Gray, 1840
 Order Heterostropha P. Fischer, 1885
 Order Opisthobranchia Milne-Edwards, 1848
 Infraorder Euthecosomata
 Infraorder Pseudothecosomata
 Infraorder Anthobranchia Férussac, 1819
 Infraorder Cladobranchia Willan & Morton, 1984
 Suborder Eupulmonata  Haszprunar & Huber, 1990
 Infraorder Acteophila Dall, 1885 (= formerly Archaeopulmonata)

Class Monoplacophora 
Order	Tryblidiida

Class Rostroconchia † 
No information available below class

Class Scaphopoda (Tusk shells) 

Order Dentaliida
Order Gadilida

See also
2010 Bivalvia taxonomy
Taxonomy of the Gastropoda (Bouchet & Rocroi, 2005)
Taxonomy of the Gastropoda (Bouchet et al., 2017)
Taxonomy of the Gastropoda (Ponder & Lindberg, 1997)
Taxonomy of the Conoidea (Tucker & Tenorio, 2009)

References

L
Orders
Taxonomic lists (orders)